Pediomorphus macleayi is a species of ground beetle in the family Carabidae.

References 

Beetles described in 1900